National City Christian Church, located on Thomas Circle in Washington, D.C., is the national church of the Christian Church (Disciples of Christ) (often abbreviated as the "Disciples of Christ" or "Christian Church").  The denomination grew out of the Stone-Campbell Movement founded by Thomas Campbell and Alexander Campbell of Pennsylvania and West Virginia (then Virginia) and Barton W. Stone of Kentucky.

History
The congregation that eventually became the National City Christian Church was organized in 1843. James Turner Barclay (1807-1874), a physician and pioneering Stone-Campbell Movement missionary, helped to organize the congregation. Prior to the erection of this building the congregation was known as Vermont Avenue Christian Church, previous building is now the home of Mt. Olivet Lutheran Church.

In the 1950s and 1960s, the church had a congregation of some 800 regular Sunday worshipers. Attendance declined over time, however; in 2011, Sunday attendance was about 125, with mostly older congregants.

In 2004, the church's senior pastor, the Rev. Alvin O. Jackson, resigned following a heated acrimonious dispute. The ouster of Jackson followed the resignation or firings of some two dozen church staffers, and the development of a deep intra-congregational dispute. Jackson was replaced as senior pastor by the Rev. Stephen Gentle, "a soft-spoken pastor of a Florida church."

Subsequently, the church's chief financial officer, Jason Todd Reynolds, was discovered to have embezzled $850,000 in church funds from 2003 to 2008. In 2011, Reynolds was convicted of 12 fraud-related charges. He was sentenced to eight years in prison. The losses from Reynolds' embezzlement scheme caused serious damage to the church's financial health.

The 2011 Virginia earthquake caused structural damage to the church building, causing financial troubles for the church.

Architecture and surroundings
The neoclassical church building was designed by John Russell Pope and completed in 1930. The church is very large in size and has a "monumental character" typical of Pope's style and seen in his other works, such as the Jefferson Memorial. The church's design was partly influenced by James Gibbs' St Martin-in-the-Fields church, built at Trafalgar Square, London, in the early 18th century. The building is built of Indiana limestone. Scholar Thomas A. Tweed writes that the building's facade, "high on a terrace overlooking Thomas Circle, a prominent location in the city ... demands the attention of motorists and pedestrians."

The church "features stained glass windows commemorating the two presidents associated with the denomination, James Garfield and Lyndon Johnson."

The church is a contributing property to the Greater Fourteenth Street Historic District.

Across the street from the National City Christian Church is the Luther Place Memorial Church, which is also a historic church. Luther Place Memorial Church's neo-Gothic style sharply contrasts with the Neoclassical style of National City Christian Church. Other historic churches nearby include the Universalist National Memorial Church.

Notable members 
Lyndon Baines Johnson, the 36th president of the United States, occasionally attended National City Christian Church during his time as president. His state funeral was held here in 1973.

James Garfield, the 20th President of the United States, was a member of National City Christian Church in one of its previous buildings.

See also
 National Register of Historic Places listings in the District of Columbia

References

External links

 National City Christian Church

Churches completed in 1930
Christian Church (Disciples of Christ) congregations
Churches in Washington, D.C.
Historic district contributing properties in Washington, D.C.
John Russell Pope buildings
Neoclassical architecture in Washington, D.C.
Religious organizations established in 1843
Christian denominations established in the 19th century
1843 establishments in Washington, D.C.
Presidential churches in the United States